The 2015 Royal Bank Cup was the 45th Canadian junior A Ice Hockey National Championship for the Canadian Junior Hockey League. It was the 45th consecutive year a national championship was awarded to this skill level since the breakaway of Major Junior hockey in 1970.

The host Portage Terriers defeated Carleton Place Canadians in the final to win their first championship since 1973.

Teams
Portage Terriers (Host)
Regular Season: 53-3-4 (1st MJHL)
Playoffs: Defeated Waywayseecappo (4-0), Defeated Virden (4-0), Defeated Steinbach (4-0) to win league, Runner-up at Western Canada Cup (4-2).
Penticton Vees  (Western #1)
Regular Season: 44-9-3-2 (1st BCHL)
Playoffs: Defeated West Kelowna (4-1), Defeated Vernon (4-3), 1st Semi-final round robin (3-1), Defeated Nanaimo (4-2) to win league, Won Western Canada Cup (4-1).
Melfort Mustangs (Western #2)
Regular Season: 39-8-9 (1st SJHL)
Playoffs: Defeated Weyburn (4-1), Defeated Nipawin (4-1), Defeated  Notre Dame (4-0) to win league, Second runner-up at Western Canada Cup (2-4).
Soo Thunderbirds (Central)
Regular Season: 38-7-1-6 (1st NOJHL)
Playoffs: Defeated Blind River (4-0), Defeated Elliot Lake (4-1), Defeated Cochrane (4-1) to win league, Won Dudley Hewitt Cup (4-1).
Carleton Place Canadians (Eastern)
Regular Season: 49-10-3 (1st CCHL)
Playoffs: Defeated Nepean (4-0), Defeated Cornwall (4-2), Defeated Pembroke (4-1) to win league, Won Fred Page Cup (3-1)

Tournament

Round Robin

Schedule and results 

All games played in Portage la Prairie, MB.

Semifinal results

Final results

Awards
Roland Mercier Trophy (Tournament MVP): Brad Bowles (Portage)
Top Forward: Brad Bowles (Portage)
Top Defencemen: Dante Fabbro (Penticton)
Top Goaltender: Guillaume Therien (Carleton Place)
Tubby Schmalz Trophy (Sportsmanship): Patrick Newell (Penticton)
Top Scorer: Brad Bowles (Portage)

Roll of League Champions
AJHL: Spruce Grove Saints
BCHL: Penticton Vees
CCHL: Carleton Place Canadians
MHL: Dieppe Commandos
MJHL: Portage Terriers
NOJHL: Soo Thunderbirds
OJHL: Toronto Patriots
QJHL: Longueuil Collège Français
SJHL: Melfort Mustangs
SIJHL: Fort Frances Lakers

References

External links
2015 Royal Bank Cup Website

Royal Bank Cup 2015
Canadian Junior Hockey League national championships
Royal Bank Cup 2015
Sport in Portage la Prairie
Royal Bank Cup 2015